"I Don't Know What He Told You" is a song written by Giulio Rapetti, Elio Cesari and Alberto Testa, with English lyrics by Robert I. Allen. Recorded in 1974 by American singer Perry Como, the Victor Records release  peaked at No. 8 on the Billboard Adult Contemporary chart. Como also made a 1973 recording of this song which was released under the title "He Couldn't Love You More".

References

1974 singles
Victor Records singles
1974 songs
Perry Como songs